GetThere is a corporate travel reservation system that is owned by Sabre Corporation. GetThere first started in 1995 as a company named Internet Travel Network (itn.net) founded by Dan Whaley, Al Whaley and Bruce Yoxsimer. It changed its name to GetThere and went public on NASDAQ under the ticker GTHR in November 1999 and was acquired by Sabre in August 2000 for $757 million. Following the acquisition, GetThere merged with the Sabre Business Travel Solutions system. It is now a part of Sabre Travel Network. The first airline reservation (SFO-LAS) ever made over the World Wide Web was made on June 5, 1995 through an ITN server in Palo Alto, CA.

Current Status 

Thousands of companies in 95 countries use GetThere. In 2012, GetThere managed $9.6 billion in online corporate spend. Each month, 5 million unique users visit GetThere to shop and book a business trip or meeting.

GetThere has SaaS-based architecture and is a global tool available in 16 languages. GetThere offers more than 3,000 configurable site options.

GetThere serves thousands of large multinational and mid-size corporations. From 2000–2016, a GetThere customer was recognized with one of the Business Travel News Travel Manager of the Year or Best Practitioner awards.

In 2012, GetThere announced two new lines of business: Global Specialty Services, which includes benchmarking for corporate travel and procurement programs, and Sabre Virtual Meetings, a global reservation system for booking and scheduling public and corporate-owned high-definition video conferencing rooms.

Products 
GetThere's on-demand software as a service (SaaS) solutions include:

 GetThere: web and mobile solutions for corporate travel management. It includes corporate travel booking and reporting.
 GetThere Mobile for smartphones: mobile web application to check itinerary, book hotels, and book airfare.

References

American travel websites